Tiruchuli is a state assembly constituency in Virudhunagar district of Tamil Nadu. It comes under Ramanathapuram Lok Sabha constituency for parliament elections. It was created after the delimitation of constituencies. It is one of the 234 State Legislative Assembly Constituencies in Tamil Nadu in India.

Some of the major demands of the Tiruchuzhi Constituency include construction of a new Bus Stand at Tiruchuzhi and Narikkudi; to upgrade the Bus stands present in Kariyapatti and Veerachozhan; to make stoppage of Silambu Express at Tiruchuzhi and Narikkudi Railway Stations; to create New SIDCO and SIPCOT Industrial Complexes at Tiruchuzhi; to upgrade the Major District Road (NH 195), (MDR 718) and (MDR 638) to a National Highway which is present in-between Nedungulam to Abhiramam via Narikudi and Veerachozhan.

Extent of assembly constituency
It comprises Kariapatti Union, Narikkudi Union, Tiruchuli Union, Aruppukkottai Taluk (part): Kulasekaranallur, Mangulam, Melakandamangalam, Kurunaikulam, Konganakurichi, Aladipatti, Bommakottai, Kallorani, Savaspuram, Kullampatti, Muthuramalingapuram, Narthampatti, Kalayarkarisalkulam, Kalyanasundarapuram, Kallumadam, Erasinnampatti, Parattanatham, Thammanaickenpatti, Vedanatham, Silukkapatti, Mandapasalai, Maravarperungudi, Thummuchinnampatti, Thirumalaipuram, Salukkuvarpatti, Suthamadam, Thoppalakarai, Rajagopalapuram, Pullanaickenpatti, Chettikulam, Kanakai, Paralachi, Melaiyur, Vadakkunatham, Therkunatham, Sengulam, Poolangal Kallakkari, Keelkudi and Purasalur, keppilingampatti. Azhagiyanallur villages.

Members of assembly

Election results

2021

2016

2011

1962

References 

Assembly constituencies of Tamil Nadu